Two submarines of the United States Navy have been named USS Blueback, after a type of trout.

 , served during World War II and then was sold to Turkey.
 , was the last non-nuclear submarine to join the United States Navy.

References

United States Navy ship names